"Forever as One" is a song by Dutch eurodance group Vengaboys released in 2001. It charted at number 28 in the UK Singles Chart, making it their worst performing single. It was also their last release before temporarily disbanding and returning to the club scene. The music video has a cameo appearance of pop band Westlife and another of Jimmy Pop. The inclusion of Westlife was not approved of by their record label, forcing a second edit of the video to be created which excluded the footage of them.

This song is unusual as it is a ballad as opposed to the usual dance type track of which the Vengaboys are best known for.

Track listing
"Forever as One (Hitradio)"
"Skinnydippin' (D-Bops Naked Mix)"
"Double-A Megamix"
"Forever as One (Enhanced Video)"

There is also a version of this EP with the Forever as One (Vocals & Strings Version).

Charts

References

2001 singles
Vengaboys songs
Pop ballads
2000 songs
Songs written by Wessel van Diepen
Songs written by Dennis van den Driesschen